Somatogyrus is a genus of very small freshwater and brackish water snails that have an operculum, aquatic gastropod mollusks in the family Hydrobiidae.

Somatogyrus is placed by WoRMS in the family Lithoglyphidae.

Species
Species within the genus Somatogyrus include:
 Reverse pebblesnail, Somatogyrus alcoviensis
 Oachita pebblesnail, Somatogyrus amnicoloides
 Goldend pebblesnail, Somatogyrus aureus
 Angular pebblesnail, Somatogyrus biangulatus
 Knotty pebblesnail, Somatogyrus constrictus
 Coosa pebblesnail, Somatogyrus coosaensis
 Thick-lipped pebblesnail, Somatogyrus crassilabris
 Stocky pebblesnail, Somatogyrus crassus
 Tennessee pebblesnail, Somatogyrus currierianus
 Hidden pebblesnail, Somatogyrus decipiens
 Ovate pebblesnail, Somatogyrus excavatus
 Fluted pebblesnail, Somatogyrus hendersoni
 Granite pebblesnail, Somatogyrus hinkleyi
 Atlas pebblesnail, Somatogyrus humerosus
 Dwarf pebblesnail, Somatogyrus nanus
 Moom pebblesnail, Somatogyrus obtusus
 Sparrow pebblesnail, Somatogyrus parvulus
 Tallapoosa pebblesnail, Somatogyrus pilsbryanus
 Pygmy pebblesnail, Somatogyrus pygmaeus
 Quadrate pebblesnail, Somatogyrus quadratus
 Mud pebblesnail, Somatogyrus sargenti
 Rolling pebblesnail, Somatogyrus strengi
 Savannah pebblesnail, Somatogyrus tenax
 Opaque pebblesnail, Somatogyrus tennesseensis
 Panhandle pebblesnail, Somatogyrus virginicus
 Channeled pebblesnail, Somatogyrus wheeleri

Species brought into synonymy:
 Somatogyrus clenchi Goodrich & Van der Schalie, 1937: synonym of Aroapyrgus clenchi (Goodrich & Van der Schalie, 1937)
 Somatogyrus mexicanus Pilsbry, 1910: synonym of Aroapyrgus mexicanus (Pilsbry, 1910)

References

 
Hydrobiidae
Taxonomy articles created by Polbot